Liolaemus rabinoi, commonly known as Rabino's tree iguana, is a species of lizard in the family Iguanidae or the family Liolaemidae. The species is endemic to Argentina.

Etymology
Both the specific name, rabinoi, and the common name, Rabino's tree iguana, are in honor of "M. Rabino" who was the collector of the holotype.

References

Further reading
Cei JM (1974). "Two new species of Ctenoblepharis (Reptilia: Iguanidae) from the arid environment of central Argentina (Mendoza Province)". Journal of Herpetology 8 (1): 71–75. (Ctenoblepharis rabinoi, new species).

rabinoi
Lizards of South America
Reptiles of Argentina
Endemic fauna of Argentina
Critically endangered animals
Critically endangered biota of South America
Reptiles described in 1974
Taxa named by José Miguel Alfredo María Cei
Taxonomy articles created by Polbot